Dybowskyia is a genus of true bugs belonging to the family Pentatomidae and tribe Tarisini.

The species of this genus are found in Europe and Japan.

Species:
 Dybowskyia reticulata (Dallas, 1851)

References

Pentatomidae genera
Podopinae